Lakeview School District may refer to:

 Lakeview School District (Battle Creek, Michigan), a school district in Battle Creek, Michigan
 Lakeview School District (Mercer County, Pennsylvania), a school district in Pennsylvania
 Lakeview School District (Oregon), a school district in Oregon
 Lakeview Local Schools, a school district in Ohio
 Lakeview Public Schools (Michigan), a school district in Michigan
 Lakeview Schools, a school district in Minnesota
 Lake View School District, a former school district in Arkansas
 Dillon School District One, a school district in Lake View, South Carolina